Rolands Broks (born 18 May 1969) is a Latvian politician, member of the Latvian Farmers' Union party and was the Minister of Education and Science of Latvia from 3 November 2010 to 25 October 2011.

References

1969 births
Living people
Politicians from Riga
Latvian Farmers' Union politicians
Ministers of Education and Science of Latvia
University of Latvia alumni